Belmontet (Languedocien: Bèlmontet) is a former commune in the Lot department in southwestern France. On 1 January 2016, it was merged into the new commune of Montcuq-en-Quercy-Blanc.

Geography
The Séoune flows southwest through the southern part of the commune, then forms part of its southwestern border.

Population

See also
Communes of the Lot department

References

Former communes of Lot (department)